Glasgow Shettleston was a burgh constituency represented in the House of Commons of the Parliament of the United Kingdom from 1918 until 2005. The Shettleston area's representation is now covered by Glasgow Central and Glasgow East.

Boundaries 
1918–1950: "That portion of the city which is bounded by a line commencing at a point on the municipal boundary about 299 yards north-westward from the centre of Carntyne Road, at a point where the municipal boundary intersects that road, thence eastward, south-eastward and westward along the municipal boundary to the centre of the Caledonian Railway Branch Line from Rutherglen to Dalmarnock, thence northward along the centre line of the said railway until it, joins the Caledonian Railway (Glasgow Lines), thence northward, north-eastward, northward and north-eastward along the centre line of the last-mentioned railway to a point 380 yards south of the centre line of Cumbernauld Road, thence south-eastward to the point of commencement."

1950–1974: The County of the City of Glasgow wards of Parkhead, Shettleston, and Tollcross, and part of Mile End ward.

1974–1983: The County of the City of Glasgow wards of Mile End and Parkhead, and parts of Shettleston and Tollcross wards.

1983–1997: The City of Glasgow District electoral divisions of Belvidere/Carntyne, Mount/Baillieston, and Parkhead/Shettleston.

1997–2005: The City of Glasgow District electoral divisions of Calton/Dalmarnock, Gorbals/Govanhill, and Shettleston/Tollcross.

Members of Parliament

Elections

Elections in the 1910s

Elections in the 1920s

Elections in the 1930s

Elections in the 1940s

Elections in the 1950s

Elections in the 1960s

Elections in the 1970s

Elections in the 1980s

Elections in the 1990s

Elections in the 2000s

References 

Historic parliamentary constituencies in Scotland (Westminster)
Constituencies of the Parliament of the United Kingdom established in 1918
Constituencies of the Parliament of the United Kingdom disestablished in 2005
Politics of Glasgow
Parkhead